Glendon is a village in northern Alberta, Canada that is north of St. Paul. The community has the maiden name of an early postmaster's mother.

In 1993, the town unveiled its roadside tribute to the perogy. It is one of the Giants of the Prairies. Next to the roadside attraction was the Perogy Cafe, which served "Ukrainian and Chinese Perogies" it is now closed. Glendon is home to former NHLer Stan Smyl.

Demographics 

In the 2016 Census of Population conducted by Statistics Canada, the Village of Glendon recorded a population of 493 living in 208 of its 234 total private dwellings, a  change from its 2011 population of 486.

See also 
List of communities in Alberta
List of villages in Alberta

References

External links 

1956 establishments in Alberta
Villages in Alberta
Ukrainian-Canadian culture in Alberta